Intelsat III F-5 was a communications satellite intended to be operated by Intelsat. Launched towards geostationary orbit in 1969 it failed to achieve orbit.

Design 
The fifth of eight Intelsat III satellites to be launched, Intelsat III F-5 was built by TRW. It was a  spacecraft equipped with two transponders to be powered by body-mounted solar cells generating 183 watts of power. It had a design life of five years and carried an SVM-2 apogee motor for propulsion.

Launch 
Intelsat III F-5 was launched by a Delta M rocket, flying from Launch Complex 17A at the Cape Canaveral Air Force Station. The launch took place on July 26, 1969, with the spacecraft bound for a geosynchronous transfer orbit.

Due to a failure in the third phase of the launch process, the satellite did not reach the desired orbit.

See also

 1969 in spaceflight

References

Intelsat satellites
Spacecraft launched in 1969
1969 in spaceflight
Satellite launch failures